Welcome to the Roses (original title: Bienvenue chez les Rozes) is a 2003 French comedy film, written and directed by Francis Palluau. It stars Jean Dujardin, Carole Bouquet and Lorànt Deutsch.

Plot
Two armed convicts on the run, one wounded, take hostage the middle-class Roze family in a pleasant French suburb. TV news reports that the two guards escorting them have been shot dead. Father, mother and 18-year-old daughter show a high degree of sympathy for and cooperation with their captors. Wounds are dressed, clothes washed, a good dinner served, fine wines drunk and separately the two women offer themselves. But slowly the picture is reversed. Rather than hardened criminals, the intruders are petty malefactors jailed through mistakes. Their escape was accidental when one guard killed the other and then committed suicide, so they are not murderers. As for the family, after the charming and sexy Madame Roze kills the maid by sinking a sickle into her back, the others are gradually revealed to be little better than their unwanted guests. In the end the two prisoners slip quietly away while the Roze family are handcuffed and led in front of all their neighbours to a police van.

Cast 

 Lorànt Deutsch as Gilbert
 Jean Dujardin as MG
 Carole Bouquet as Béatrice
 Clémence Poésy as Magali
 André Wilms as Daniel
 Yolande Moreau as Marsanne
 Dominique Pinon as The Lieutenant
 Michel Duchaussoy as Jean-Louis
 Beatrice Rosen as Agnès
 Christian Pereira as Doctor Merlot
 Clément van den Bergh as Ludovic
 Michèle Comba as Gilbert's mother
 Michel Derville as The banker
 Jean-Baptiste Shelmerdine as The junkie
 Olivier Saladin as The neighbor
 Charlotte Becquin as The young professor
 Daniel Kenigsberg as The headmaster
 Philippe Lamendin as The journalist
 Daniela Lumbroso as The journalist
 Vincent Martin as The lawyer

References

External links

2003 films
2000s French-language films
2003 black comedy films
French black comedy films
2003 comedy films
2000s French films